Frank X. Bauer (October 4, 1862 - December 28, 1922) was a brewery worker and beer truckdriver from Milwaukee, Wisconsin who served one term as a Socialist member of the Wisconsin State Assembly.

Background 
Bauer was born in Bavaria on October 4, 1862. He received his education in the country school near his home. In 1888 he came to America, going directly to Milwaukee. Two years later he went to work for a brewery and for 21 years was a bottled beer distributor. As of 1919 he had belonged to the Beer Drivers Union Local #72 for 27 years, and for four years had been secretary and business agent for the Beer Drivers, Chauffeurs and Stablemen's Union Local 72, for Engineers' and Firemen's Union Local 25, and for Maltsters Union Local 89. He served as alderman of the 19th Ward of the City of Milwaukee for two years.

Legislative service 
Bauer was elected to the Assembly in 1918 for the 15th Milwaukee County assembly district (the 15th and 19th wards of the City of Milwaukee), with 1,958 votes to 1,955 for incumbent Republican State Representative Theodore Engel (to whom Bauer had lost in the 1916 election for the same seat) and 1,371 for Democrat Leonard Broennen. He was assigned to the standing committee on contingent expenditures.

He was not a candidate for re-election in 1920, and was succeeded by Engel. He died on December 28, 1922, and was buried in Milwaukee.

References 

1862 births
Bavarian emigrants to the United States
Brewery workers
Members of the Wisconsin State Assembly
Wisconsin city council members
Politicians from Milwaukee
Socialist Party of America politicians from Wisconsin
American truck drivers
1922 deaths
American trade unionists of German descent